Bridget Olivia Carragher (born 17 June 1957) is a South African physicist specializing in electron microscopy. She is an adjunct professor at the Columbia University (New York City, NY), and alongside Clint Potter, is also the director of the National Resource for Automated Molecular Microscopy (NRAMM), director of the Simons Electron Microscopy Center at New York Structural Biology Center (New York City, NY) and PI at the National Center for CryoEM Access and Training. She is also the Founder and Chief Operations Officer of NanoImaging Services, Inc.

Personal life 
Carragher was born and grew up in South Africa. She lived in Ghana during her childhood and for one year in England. After earning her master's degree, she moved to the United States and has lived there since. Carragher is an American citizen, she is married and has two children.

Education 
Carragher received her first education at the University of the Witwatersrand, South Africa, in the field of Physics (B.Sc.: 1975–1977; B.Sc. Hons: 1978-1978; M.Sc.: 1979–1981). In 1982 she graduated from Northwestern University, Evanston, Illinois (M.Sc. in physics). In the same year, she started her PhD at University of Chicago, Chicago, Illinois, that she defended in 1987.

Career 
For most of her career, Carragher has been involved in developing streamlined and automated electron microscopy (EM) methods aimed at improving both the quality of EM data and the accessibility of these techniques to the broader biological community.

After her Ph.D., Carragher worked in various positions, both in industry and academia, until moving to the Scripps Research Institute in 2001. Since 2002, she has served with Clint Potter as the Director of the National Resource for Automated Molecular Microscopy (NRAMM), an NIH-funded national biotechnology research resource. The NRAMM specializes in developing and applying automated technologies for EM and providing training at all levels.

In 2007 Carragher co-founded a new company, NanoImaging Services, Inc., where she serves as Chief Operations Officer. The company aims to provide cryoEM and other microscopy services to the biopharmaceutical and biotechnology industries.

In 2015 Carragher and Clint moved their academic lab from The Scripps Research Institute to the New York Structural Biology Center, where they serve as co-directors of the Simons Electron Microscopy Center. In May 2018, they were awarded a U24 grant to start the National Center for CryoEM Access and Training (NCCAT).

Contribution to Science 
Throughout her career, Carragher has published 165 papers, received several research funding grants and owns five patents.

Patents 

 Smith PE, Callahan MP, Daniel I, Potter CS, Carragher B, Suloway CJ, inventors; Robotic system for sequencing multiple specimens between a holding tray and microscope. 2005, US 2005/0107917 A1.
 Mulder A, Carragher B, Potter CS, inventors; Characterization of particulates using electron microscopy and image processing methods. 2011, Provisional. Filed 8/17/2011.
 Carragher B, Potter CS, Jain T, inventors; Preparation of specimen arrays on an EM grid. 2012, Provisional. Filed 1/17/2012.
 Carragher B, Potter CS, Jain T, inventors; Superhydrophilic specimen grids for electron microscopy. 2012, Provisional. Filed 1/17/2012.
 Carragher B, Potter CS, Jain T, Kahn P, Wiktor P, inventors; Apparatus and method for producing specimens for electron microscopy. 2012, Provisional. Filed 1/17/2012.

Contributions to the EM field

Additional selected contributions to the EM field

CryoEM automation 
Carragher was an early advocate for automated methods for electron microscopy. She developed software to analyze poorly ordered sickle cell hemoglobin fibers and went on to collaborate with Ron Milligan's group to develop a pipeline for helical processing (Phoelix). Together with Clint Potter, Carragher then led the development of Leginon, a system for automated control and data acquisition from an electron microscope, and Appion, a pipeline for single particle data processing. Recently they showed that they could use this automated pipeline to obtain maps to a resolution of 2.8 Å.

New technologies for TEM 
Carragher and her team have developed a number of novel technologies for transmission electron microscopy (TEM). These include Spotiton, an inkjet dispense and vitrification system for cryo-TEM, robotic devices to load TEM specimens into the microscope, liquid handling robots for controlling sample vitrification and negative staining, and new substrates, including one that led to grids that are now commercially available under the trade name Cflats.

Contributions to structural biology 
The major goals of technology development have been driven by the needs of compelling biological research projects. These are normally managed by a graduate student or post-doctoral fellow who establishes close lines of communication between the EM group and the biological research lab. While their major role is to manage the technical efforts, they are often also intimately involved in guiding the biological questions and writing the papers. The authors of these papers were graduate students or post-docs in Carragher's labs.

Contributions to the field: 
Carragher has been involved in a number of efforts to validate and improve methods for the entire field. These include a particle picking workshop, the recent CTF challenge and a number of workshops organized by the EMDB to discuss standards and validation. She have also organized numerous workshops, including the NRAMM biennial Advanced Methods Workshop.

References 

Cell biologists
University of Chicago alumni
Scripps Research alumni
Structural biologists
American scientists
Living people
1957 births